Stomopteryx flavoclavella is a moth of the family Gelechiidae. It was described by Zerny in 1935. It is found in Morocco and Spain.

References

Moths described in 1935
Stomopteryx